Frankiewicz is a Polish surname. Notable people with the surname include:

 Kazimierz Frankiewicz (born 1939), Polish footballer
 Wioletta Frankiewicz (born 1977), Polish athlete
 Zygmunt Frankiewicz (born 1955), Polish politician

Polish-language surnames